Denis Khlopotnov (born January 27, 1978) is a Russian former professional ice hockey goaltender.  He played in the Russian Superleague for HC CSKA Moscow, Metallurg Magnitogorsk, HC Spartak Moscow and Khimik Moscow Oblast.  He was drafted 209th overall by the Florida Panthers in the 1996 NHL Entry Draft.

External links

1978 births
Living people
Florida Panthers draft picks
HC CSKA Moscow players
HC Khimik Voskresensk players
Metallurg Magnitogorsk players
HC Spartak Moscow players
Muskegon Fury players
Russian ice hockey goaltenders
Russian expatriate sportspeople in the United States